John Alan McPherson (December 30, 1941 - December 21, 2007) was an American cinematographer, film director, and screenwriter.

He was born on December 30, 1941, in Los Angeles.

He began working in films and television as a gaffer in the mid-1960s. He worked as director of photography for television series as Kojak  (1977), The Incredible Hulk (1978), Darkroom (1981), Voyagers! (1982), St. Elsewhere, Baywatch (1989) and Amazing Stories (1985) for which he won an Emmy Award. He also photographed the telefilms The Archer: Fugitive from the Empire (1981), Senior Trip (1981), Eleanor, First Lady of the World (1982), V (1983), Hot Pursuit (1984), A Reason to Live (1985), Acceptable Risk (1986) and Alien Nation (1989); and he was the cinematographer for Just One of the Guys (1985), Jaws: The Revenge (1987), Batteries Not Included (1987), Short Circuit 2 (1988), Fletch Lives (1989), Career Opportunities (1991) and Bingo (1991).

He directed the tele-films Strays (1991), Dirty Work (1992), Fade to Black (1993), Incident at Deception Ridge (1994) and Simon & Simon: In Trouble Again (1995); and episodes of the series Swamp Thing, Strange Luck (1995), JAG (1995), Sliders (1995), Babylon 5, Nash Bridges (1996), Beverly Hills, 90210 and Seven Days (1998).

He won an Outstanding Achievement in Cinematography for a Series for "The Mission" on Amazing Stories.

He died at his home in Westlake Village, California on 21 December 2007 aged 65.

References

External links
 
 

1941 births
2007 deaths
American cinematographers
Film directors from Los Angeles
Film producers from California
American male screenwriters
Screenwriters from California
American television writers
20th-century American male writers
20th-century American screenwriters